The Gimpo Hangang Highway (Korean: 김포한강로; Gimpo Hangang Ro), is a 6-lanes highway in South Korea, connecting Gangseo District, Seoul to Gimpo, Gyeonggi Province.

Main stopovers
 Seoul
 Gaehwa-dong
 Gyeonggi Province
 Gimpo (Gochon-eup - Sau-dong - Geolpo-dong - Unyang-dong)

Composition
 Notes
 IC : Interchange
 IS : Intersection
 TN : Tunnel
 BR : Bridge

See also 
 Roads and expressways in South Korea
 Transportation in South Korea
 Olympic-daero

References

External links 
 MOLIT South Korean Government Transport Department

Gyeonggi Province
Seoul
Roads in Seoul
Roads in Gyeonggi